The Zorn is a river that flows through the Lorraine and the Alsace as the largest and last of the tributaries of the river Moder, before the latter empties into the Rhine. It rises on the territory of Walscheid as the Yellow Zorn (German: Gelber Zorn, French: Zorn Jaune) and becomes the Zorn after its confluence with the right-hand tributary, the White Zorn (Ge: Weißer Zorn, Fr.: Zorn Blanche). It has a length of just under 97 kilometres and drains an area of 757 km².
The French spelling Zorn first surfaced in the 18th century. Hitherto the river was called the Sorn, which stems from the pre-Celtic era and probably meant "the flowing one". The upper reaches of the river as far as Saverne are viewed as having great, scenic beauty and are also home to many fine examples of architecture.

Tributaries  
White Zorn (right), 8.5 km
Treubach (left)
Mittbach (left)
Ruisseau de Dabo (right)
Fischbach (right)
Ruisseau de Heyerst (left), 3.7 km
Tiergartenbach (right), 3.7 km
Hesselgraben (left)
Stutzbach (left), 4.7 km
Ruisseau le Mundel (right), 1.6 km
Baerenbach (right), 11.3 km
Ruisseau de la Fontaine Mélanie (left), 4.5 km
Schlettenbach (left)
Michelsbaechel (left), 5.1 km
Liesgraben (left)
Liesmattgraben (left), 3.4 km
Southern Zinsel (rivière la zinsel du sud) (left), 30.9 km
Mossel (rivière la mossel) (right), 21.2 km
Horattgraben (right)
Lienbach (left), 9.5 km
Littenheimerbach (Morenthalgraben) (right), 3.1 km
Rohrbach (right)
Embsbaechel (Bachgraben) (left), 12.7 km
Gebolsheimerbach (left) (via the Landgraben 11.2 km)
Mattgraben (right), 1.2 km
Rissbach (left), 8.0 km
Seltenbach (left) (via the Hochstettergraben 9.6 km)

References

External links
La Zorn à Hoerdt, Banque Hydro

Rivers of Grand Est
Tributaries of the Moder
Rivers of Moselle (department)
Rivers of Bas-Rhin
Rivers of France